Miroslav Šarić (born 7 February 1986) is a Croatian professional footballer who plays for Trešnjevka Zagreb.

Club career

Croatia
On 15 December 2004, he made his debut for Dinamo Zagreb as an 83rd-minute substitute during the UEFA Cup group match against VfB Stuttgart. Since then, he didn't feature any matches for Dinamo Zagreb.

His name started to become popular in local when he was playing for Inter Zaprešić, when he featured in 13 matches and scored five goals in the 2009–10 season.

He joined another top division club, Lučko, in the summer of 2011. He earned 16 starts and scored three goals, although his performance could not help the team survive from relegation. He left the club after the season.

Hong Kong
On 17 August 2012, Šarić joined Hong Kong First Division League club Biu Chun Rangers for an undisclosed fee.

On 1 September 2012, he scored a goal on his debut match against Southern, which he started as an attacking midfielder and played for the whole match. He was released on 4 June 2014.

In the 2014–15 season he played for Eastern. Šarić left the club in May 2017 before the end of season playoffs.

Honours
Eastern
Hong Kong Senior Shield: 2014–15
Hong Kong Premier League: 2015–16

References

External links
 

1986 births
Living people
Footballers from Zagreb
Association football midfielders
Croatian footballers
Croatia youth international footballers
GNK Dinamo Zagreb players
NK Međimurje players
NK Kamen Ingrad players
NK Inter Zaprešić players
NK Lučko players
Hong Kong Rangers FC players
Eastern Sports Club footballers
Metro Gallery FC players
NK Krka players
NK Trešnjevka players
Croatian Football League players
Hong Kong First Division League players
Croatian expatriate footballers
Expatriate footballers in Hong Kong
Croatian expatriate sportspeople in Hong Kong
Expatriate footballers in Slovenia
Croatian expatriate sportspeople in Slovenia
Hong Kong League XI representative players